What on Earth! (French: La Terre est habitée!) is a 1966 National Film Board of Canada animated short co-directed by Les Drew and Kaj Pindal. The film is a mockumentary, introduced in its opening credits as produced by the "National Film Board of Mars" that takes a humorous look at car culture from the point of view of fictional Martians, who mistake automobiles for Earth's true inhabitants and people as their parasites. It attempts to examine the sociology of the automobile as the dominant species on earth, and makes wild guesses about the lifestyle, feeding habits, mating habits and funeral rites of this "species."

Plot
The film shows the earth from the view of an orbiting Martian spaceship, which did not land but used cameras to film earth society. It follows average (what it believes to be) earthlings and their civilization, by in effect showing a "day in the life" and how they live it. First, it shows one having dinner - a precisely regulated feeding (vehicle refueling from a gas pump), then how it must take its rest (pulling into a house's attached garage), because the next day will be a busy one.

The next morning it shows a large number of earthlings (cars) out traveling on roads and highways. The earthlings apparently enjoy "all play and no work" and do not tolerate anything that impairs their "smooth, fast life"; slowdowns cause significant complaints (honking) until a worker arrives to fix the problem (a traffic jam is solved when a batch of construction vehicles "eat" a mountain to open the roadway, and cover a chasm to build a new bridge). The presence of many earthlings (vehicles) in traffic is presumed to be the need for companionship. But if their desire for companionship and dancing is interrupted, social directors who never leave their post (traffic signals) will instruct them.

With this fun comes exhaustion (tow trucks pulling cars). There is a steady run on spas and health centers (car washes and repair shops). Libraries (road signs and billboards) and audio-visual centers (drive-in theaters) are readily available. When they become too old, earthlings move to retirement parks (used car lots) and then, when it is time, earthlings perform their final act; they instruct a worker to perform euthanasia on them (being crushed in a wrecking yard), so that they can reproduce. Earthlings have eliminated sex, and reproduce (in secret) in three or four large breeding centers (car factories). The Martian narrator of the film tells his audience that their scientists believe that the process of earthling reproduction "must go something like this", after which is shown a completely incorrect version of how a car is built.  However, at the end of this demonstration, it is stated that, "a newborn earthling, fully grown, is ready for its place in society".

Despite their advancement, the earthlings have not eliminated the parasites that infest them (human beings and pets) are
working on eradicating their nests (tearing down buildings). The film ends with the Martians' hope that they will soon be able to actually send visitors to meet with the earthlings.

Production
The film was first proposed at the NFB by Pindal in December 1963, with the working title Automation, with the intention of showing how "in spite of appearances, man is the master in the automated world." The working title would become Martians, before the final title What on Earth! was chosen. Drew was brought in to work on the film in 1965 and 1966, with Brittain assigned to write narration. Pindal's original idea of "man as the master" is not reflected in the final version of the film, and NFB archivist and blogger Albert Ohayon believes Brittain may have been responsible for this key change.

Release
What on Earth! was completed in late 1966 and shown to distributors including Columbia Pictures, which purchased international theatrical rights in January 1967. Following a successful theatrical run, the film was sold to approximately 30 networks around the world, beginning in 1969. TV sales included CBC-TV in Canada and the ABC TV network in the US. The ABC sale was for seven animated shorts, including Walking, Cosmic Zoom and Hot Stuff, and marked the first time NFB films had been sold to a major American television network. The films aired on ABC in the fall of 1971 as part of the children's television show Curiosity Shop, executive produced by Chuck Jones.

Awards
 International Science Fiction Film Festival, Trieste: Silver Seal of the City of Trieste, 1967
Salerno Film Festival, Salerno: Minister of Entertainment Cup, 1970
 American Film and Video Festival, New York: Blue Ribbon, 1971
 40th Academy Awards, Los Angeles: Nominee: Best Short Subject, Cartoons, 1968

References

External links
Watch What on Earth!

1966 films
1960s science fiction films
National Film Board of Canada animated short films
Canadian animated short films
Columbia Pictures short films
1960s science fiction comedy films
Animated films about automobiles
Films about extraterrestrial life
Films directed by Kaj Pindal
Mars in film
Canadian mockumentary films
Quebec films
1966 animated films
1960s animated short films
Columbia Pictures animated short films
1966 comedy films
1960s American films
1960s Canadian films